The 2007 ATP Tour was the global elite men's professional tennis circuit organised by the Association of Tennis Professionals (ATP) for the 2007 tennis season. The ATP Tour is the elite tour for professional tennis organized by the Association of Tennis Professionals. The ATP Tour includes the four Grand Slam tournaments, the Tennis Masters Cup, the ATP Masters Series, the International Series Gold and the International Series tournaments.

Round-robin trial 
In August 2006 the ATP announced that it would conduct a trial of the round-robin tournament format during the 2007 season. ATP Executive Chairman Etienne De Villiers claimed their research showed a preference for this tournament setup among fans, tournaments and media. In a round-robin tournament each player competes once against every other player in his group. The only men's tournament using this format was the season-ending event but all regular tournaments, including the Grand Slams, used the traditional elimination or knock-out system. The round-robin format would be tested at 13 events during the 2007 ATP Tour but the Masters Series events and the Grand Slam tournaments were excluded from the experiment. The Adelaide International was scheduled as the pilot. Initial reactions from players were mixed, with Rafael Nadal in favor of the scheme and Roger Federer opposed. In early March 2007 at the Las Vegas Channel Open there was controversy when the ATP decided that James Blake had qualified for the quarterfinals only to revert that decision hours later. Player reactions became increasingly negative, claiming the format was confusing and could enable match-fixing. On 21 March 2007 the ATP announced that it had abandoned the experiment and had decided that the remaining scheduled round-robin tournaments would revert to the single-elimination form.

Schedule 
The table below shows the 2007 ATP Tour schedule
Key

January

February

March

April

May

June

July

August

September

October

November

ATP rankings 

Points were awarded as follows:

+H: Any Challenger or Futures providing hospitality shall receive the points of the next highest prize
money level in that category. $/€25,000+H Challengers receive points shown at$/€50,000. Monies
shown for Challengers and Futures are on-site prize amounts.

(*): 5 points only if the Main Draw is larger than 32 (International Series) or 64 (Tennis Masters Series)

In addition to the points allocated above, points are allocated to losers at Grand Slam, Tennis Masters Series and
International Series Gold Tournaments qualifying events in the following manner:
 Grand Slams: 8 points for a last round loser, 4 points for a second round loser
 Tennis Masters Series: 8 points for a last round loser(*), 1 point for a first round loser
 International Series Gold: 5 points for a last round loser(*), 1 point for a first round loser,

(*): 3 points only if the Main Draw is larger than 32 (International Series Gold) or 64 (Tennis Masters Series).

Statistics

Titles won by player 

 Winners/runners-up by country:

ATP prize money leaders 
As of 19 November 2007

Retirements 
Following is a list of notable players (winners of a main tour title, and/or part of the ATP rankings top 100 (singles) or top 50 (doubles) for at least one week) who announced their retirement from professional tennis, became inactive (after not playing for more than 52 weeks), or were permanently banned from playing, during the 2007 season:

  Wayne Arthurs (born 18 March 1971 in Adelaide, Australia) He turned professional in 1990 and reached his career-high singles ranking of no. 44 in 2001. He earned only one career singles title. In doubles, he was ranked no. 11 in 2003 and earned 12 career titles. His last career singles and doubles matches were at Wimbledon.
  Kenneth Carlsen (born April 17, 1973, in Copenhagen, Denmark) He turned profession in 1991 and achieved a career-high ranking of no. 41. He played his last ATP match at the Stockholm Open in October and his last match at a Challenger tournament in Kolding, Denmark a week later against Björn Phau.
  Arnaud Di Pasquale (born 11 February 1979 in Casablanca, Morocco) He turned professional in 1998 and reached his highest ranking of no. 39 in 2000. He won a bronze medal at the 2000 Olympics and played his last match in November 2006 in Asuncion against Guillermo Cañas.
  Tim Henman (born 6 September 1974 in Oxford, England) He turned professional in 1993 and achieved the ranking of world no. 4. He was a four-time semifinalist and four-time quarterfinalist at Wimbledon and reached the semifinals of the French and US Opens once each. He won one Masters 1000 event in Paris in 2003. He played his last match at the Davis Cup competition against Croatia in September.
  Jiří Novák (born March 22, 1975, in Gottwaldov, Czechoslovakia) He turned professional in 1993 and reached a career-high ranking of world no. 5 in 2002. He was a semifinalist at the 2002 Australian Open and won seven career titles. He played his last match in June in Košice, Slovakia against Lukáš Rosol.
  Greg Rusedski (born 6 September 1973, in Montreal, Quebec, Canada) He turned professional in 1991 and reached a career-high ranking of world no. 4. He was a finalist at the US Open in 1997 and earned 15 career titles. He played his last match in March in Sarajevo against Kenneth Carlsen.
  Sjeng Schalken (born 8 September 1976 in Weert, Netherlands) He turned professional in 1994 and reached his career-high ranking of no. 11 in 2003. He reached the semifinals of the US Open in 2002 and the quarterfinals at Wimbledon in 2002, 2003, and 2004. He earned nine career singles titles. In doubles, he was ranked no. 21 in 2002 and reached the semifinals of the US Open in 2001 and the quarterfinals at Wimbledon in 2001. He earned six career doubles titles and played his last career match in February 2006 in Bergamo, Italy against Simone Bolelli.

See also 
 2007 in tennis
 2007 WTA Tour

References

External links 
 Official website Association of Tennis Professionals (ATP)

 
ATP Tour
ATP Tour seasons